Izere is a dialect continuum  of Plateau languages in Nigeria. According to Blench (2008), it is four languages, though Ethnologue does not distinguish NW and NE Izere. The Cen and Ganang varieties are spoken by only 2000 each. Cen has added Berom noun-class prefixes and consonant alternation to an Izere base.

Dialects
Blench (2019) lists the following Izere dialects.

Fobur
Northeastern (Federe)
Southern (Foron)
Ichèn
Faishang
Ganang

Phonology
The Izere phonetic inventory includes 29 consonants and seven vowels and distinguishes three tone levels; two additional contour tones appear only rarely, in loanwords and due to onomatopoeia.

Consonants
The consonant phonemes of Izere are shown in the following table.

Vowels
The vowel phonemes of Izere are shown in the following table.

Tonemes
There are three level (L, M & H) and two contour tonemes (LM & HL) in Izere; the latter two are found only in loanwords and onomatopoeia.

References

Blench (2008) Prospecting proto-Plateau. Manuscript.

External links
Roger Blench: Izere page

Central Plateau languages
Languages of Nigeria